Jan Hladík (born 29 September 1993) is a Czech football player, who currently plays for FC Zbrojovka Brno as a striker.

References

External links
 Profile at MSFL.cz
 

1993 births
Living people
Czech footballers
SK Sigma Olomouc players
FC Zbrojovka Brno players
1. SC Znojmo players
SK Líšeň players
Association football forwards
1. SK Prostějov players
Czech National Football League players
People from Znojmo
Sportspeople from the South Moravian Region